Gary Heavin (born 1955) is an American businessman from Texas. He is the founder of the fitness chain Curves International.

Career
Heavin dropped out of college at age 20 and took over a failing fitness center in Houston, Texas.  Along with his brother David, he built the business into a chain of 14 locations. He was a millionaire by age 25 but then lost it all by age 30; he filed for bankruptcy.

After his first marriage, Heavin was sentenced to jail for failure to pay child support.  While in jail he rededicated his life to Jesus Christ, and he has been outspoken about his support of anti-abortion causes.

In 2004 Heavin was named the Ernst & Young Entrepreneur of the Year.  He is also the author of several books, including Curves: Permanent Results Without Permanent Dieting and Curves On the Go.

Heavin and his second wife Diane opened their first Curves center in 1992 in Harlingen, Texas. Curves is now based in Waco, Texas.

By 2007, Curves had over 10,000 locations and was the largest fitness chain in the world. However, since selling Curves to North Castle Partners, a private equity company, more than 75% of the Curves franchises have closed. North America is now the home of approximately 600 Curves franchises.

The Heavins currently reside in Mound in central Texas.
On April 3, 2011, they were featured on ABC's show Secret Millionaire, where they gave away $410,000.

Gary and Diane Heavin have recently began to produce "movies that make a difference." Mission Air is a Christian movie that has been available since 2013. Amerigeddon is an action adventure film that opened in 30 theaters on May 13, 2016.

Views
Heavin was a guest on The Ron Paul Liberty Report on April 4, 2018, and has referred to himself as a "right-to-life" libertarian and is for a non-interventionist foreign policy.

In 2020, Heavin gave $10,000 to the Oath Keepers, the far-right anti-government militia organization that helped lead the 2021 United States Capitol attack.

References

1955 births
Living people
20th-century American businesspeople
20th-century Christians
21st-century American businesspeople
21st-century Christians
American anti-abortion activists
American libertarians
Businesspeople from Texas
Christian libertarians
Christians from Texas
Non-interventionism
People from Coryell County, Texas